The Texas may refer to:

The Texas (Daphne, Alabama), listed on the National Register of Historic Places in Baldwin County, Alabama
 The Texas (locomotive), listed on the National Register of Historic Places in Fulton County, Georgia